National Highway 156, commonly referred to as NH 156, is a highway connecting the city of Nimbahera to Madhya Pradesh Border.

References

External links
 Openstreetmap 

National highways in India